Stephanie DeFina Johnson (born March 8, 1946) is an American former amateur tennis player who was active in the 1960s and early 1970s.

DeFina was included in the year-end top ten rankings issued by the United States Lawn Tennis Association from 1966 through 1968, reaching a career high ranking of seventh in 1967.

Her best singles result at a Grand Slam tournament was reaching the fourth round of the 1967 Wimbledon Championships in which she lost to Ann Jones.

In 1966, she reached the final of the U.S. Women's Clay Court Championships before falling to Nancy Richey. In 1969, she was a doubles runner-up at the New England Women's Invitational Indoor Tennis Championships (teaming with Kathy Pigeon) and was the singles runner-up at the U.S. Indoor Championships.

At the tournament in Cincinnati, DeFina won two singles titles: in 1963 (defeating Jane "Peaches" Bartkowicz in the final) and 1965 (defeating Roberta Alison in the final). She also paired with Alison to win the Cincinnati doubles title in 1965.

In 1968 DeFina was a member of the U.S. team that competed for the Wightman Cup, the annual women's team tennis competition between the United States and Great Britain. She played the doubles match partnering Kathy Harter but lost to the sister team of Christine Truman Janes and Nell Truman.

DeFina was a member of the 1974 World Team Tennis champion Denver Racquets.

References

External links
 
 
 Colorado Tennis Hall of Fame biography

American female tennis players
American people of Italian descent
Tennis people from Florida
Tennis people from New York (state)
1946 births
Living people
21st-century American women